Ylli Sallahi (born 6 April 1994) is an Austrian professional footballer who plays as a left-back and is a free agent. He most recently played for Karlsruher SC in the 3. Liga.

Early life
Born in Skenderaj to a Kosovar-Albanian family, Sallahi moved to Austria when he was only eight months old.

Club career

Early career
In his youth he played for local club Kapfenberger SV before being signed by Bayern Munich in 2011. He commented "I want to develop my career in a big club." He was a regular for the youth team, playing 27 matches in the first season for the U19 team.

On 5 April 2014, Sallahi made his Bundesliga debut, starting away to FC Augsburg, after head coach Pep Guardiola decided to rest some of the players of the first team for the UEFA Champions League quarter-final against Manchester United. He was substituted after 51 minutes for David Alaba as Bayern, who were already league champions, lost 1–0.

Karlsruher SC
On 19 December 2014, effective 1 January 2015, Sallahi signed a contract with Karlsruher SC which runs to June 2018. He left the club after the 2016–17 season.

In late August 2017 Sallahi started a trial with TSV 1860 Munich but had to end training early after 30 minutes, "probably due to a muscle injury".

International
In January 2014, Sallahi refused to play for Albania, whereas in May of that year he declared he would not play for Austria either, but only for Kosovo. Nevertheless, he made his debut for the Austria U21 team in a 4–2 victory over the Czech U21 on 14 November 2014, and has thus far earned five caps.

Kosovo
On 21 September 2016, Sallahi agreed to play for the Kosovo national team, his country of birth.

Honours

Club
Bayern Munich
 Bundesliga: 2013–14
 DFB-Pokal: 2013–14

References

External links
 
 Eurosport profile
 German career stats - FuPa

1994 births
Living people
Sportspeople from Skenderaj
Association football fullbacks
Austrian footballers
Austria under-21 international footballers
Austria youth international footballers
Kosovan footballers
Austrian people of Kosovan descent
FC Bayern Munich footballers
FC Bayern Munich II players
Karlsruher SC players
Bundesliga players
2. Bundesliga players
Kosovan emigrants to Austria
Austrian expatriate footballers
Expatriate footballers in Germany
Austrian expatriate sportspeople in Germany